Arts Collaboratory is a program promoted by Hivos and DOEN Foundation to support independent visual arts organizations in Africa, Asia and Latin America and social innovation. The program is having a major role in providing fundings for contemporary art and practices in countries where few resources in this field are available.

History 
The program was established in 2007 by the Dutch organizations Hivos and DOEN Foundation and it is implemented in collaboration with Mondriaan Foundation.

Activities 
The program provides funding and it supports knowledge sharing and artistic exchange.
The fundings are
 Long term support for independent visual arts organizations focusing on collaborative art practices and social innovation. The supports addresses independent visual organizations based in Africa, Asia and Latin America and it is provided for a 28 month-programme.
 Project Fund for ‘Visual Arts and Social Innovation’ (up to 15'000 euro per project).

See also 
 Hivos
 DOEN Foundation
 Prince Claus Fund

References

Bibliography 
 Jos Schuring, Artscollaboratory, programme by Hivos, DOEN and Mondriaan Stichting in "The Power of Culture", June 2007.
 Arts Collaboratory: Best Practice Presentation, res artis, Amsterdam, 2008.

External links 
 Arts Collaboratory website
 Arts Collaboratory on the DOEN Foundation website
 Arts Collaboratory on the Hivos website
 Arts Collaboratory on C& Platform for International art from African Perspective

Contemporary art organizations
Funding bodies of the Netherlands
Arts organisations based in the Netherlands